Chickenley is suburban village in the Borough of  Kirklees, West Yorkshire, England. It is part of Dewsbury after being originally a farming hamlet, half-way between Ossett and Dewsbury.

The Chickenley name could derive from a family name originating during early settlement, corrupted to "Chick" over the years or a man who had a chicken called 'Ley' and decided to change the name to Chickenley (as the town was previously called 'Cowbob'). An old story is that when a maypole was built in the Gawthorpe area of Ossett in 1840, men from Chickenley came to tear it down. Some of the early settlers to the area were a family of Italian tinkers, the Cascarinos and also of Irish origin the Taylors; these family names still exist in the area. After the Second World War a council estate was built in the area. The estate is the largest in Dewsbury and has a doctors and shops within it. 
 Chickenley has no Church of England church, although there is St Thomas More Catholic Church, opposite Chickenley Community School on Chickenley Lane.  Until recently the estate was linked with the Gawthorpe area of Ossett as part of a Church of England parish. However, it is now part of the large parish of Dewsbury, which has several churches within its area. Gawthorpe's St Mary's Church C.of E. church was at the border with Ossett, but was demolished in March 2011.

The local elections of 4 May 2006 saw the BNP gain the "Dewsbury East" ward, which includes the estate - but the seat was regained by the Labour Party in the 5 May 2007 election.

References

Heavy Woollen District
Villages in West Yorkshire